Reginald Arthur Edward Magee  (born August 1914 - unknown), known as Reggie Magee, was a unionist politician in Northern Ireland.

Born in Belfast, Magee studied at Campbell College and then medicine at Queen's University Belfast.  He worked as a gynaecologist at various hospitals in the city, becoming a Fellow of the Royal College of Surgeons of Ireland and of the Royal College of Obstetricians and Gynaecologists.  He also held senior roles on the Northern Ireland Hospitals Authority, and lectured at Queen's University.

Magee joined the Ulster Unionist Party in 1946, and was elected in Belfast South at the 1973 Northern Ireland Assembly election, following which he became Chairman of the unionist backbenchers.  He stood again for the Northern Ireland Constitutional Convention, this time for the Unionist Party of Northern Ireland, but narrowly missed election.

References

1914 births
Year of death unknown
Academics of Queen's University Belfast
Alumni of Queen's University Belfast
British gynaecologists
Commanders of the Order of the British Empire
Members of the Northern Ireland Assembly 1973–1974
People educated at Campbell College
Politicians from Belfast
Ulster Unionist Party politicians
Unionist Party of Northern Ireland politicians